The Emma Giles was the best known and most popular sidewheel passenger steamer that operated out of Baltimore, Maryland.

Destinations
One of her more popular destinations was Tolchester Beach, Maryland.

She docked at the Nowell pier on Parrish Creek and
later at the Shady Side pier when serving the West River.  The Emma Giles made two trips per week between Baltimore and Shady Side, but by the 1930s, it increased its service to five trips per week.

She served the Rhode River between 1891 and 1932, making five trips per week.

In Annapolis, Maryland, she docked at a wharf at the foot of Prince George Street.

Collision
On New Year's Day 1924, the Emma Giles collided with an ocean-going freighter, the SS Steel Trader owned by U.S. Steel in heavy fog near the Little Choptank River.  The Emma Giles sustained damage on her starboard side, including her paddle.  52 passengers were aboard at the time but none were injured.   She was towed back to Baltimore by the tug Brittania, repaired and returned to service.

Fate
After ending service as a steamer, she functioned as a barge, then a breakwater. Eventually, the Emma Giles was towed up the Patapsco River and Curtis Creek beyond the Pennington Avenue Bridge and burned to facilitate salvage of metal parts.  As of 2005, its stern was still visible and had been spray painted with a sign that says "Free to good home."

References

Culture of Baltimore
Passenger ships of the United States
Steamboats of the United States
Paddle steamers of the United States
1887 ships
Maritime incidents in 1924
1924 in Maryland